Pulečný is a municipality and village in Jablonec nad Nisou District in the Liberec Region of the Czech Republic. It has about 500 inhabitants.

Administrative parts

Villages of Klíčnov and Kopanina are administrative parts of Pulečný.

History
The first written mention of Pulečný is from 1543. Between 1636 and 1850, the village was part of the Český Dub manor.

References

Villages in Jablonec nad Nisou District